Agonopterix hoenei is a moth in the family Depressariidae. It was described by Alexandr L. Lvovsky and Shu-Xia Wang in 2011. It is found in Yunnan, China.

The wingspan is about 25 mm. The forewings are white, tinged with yellowish brown and with brown specks. The terminal fourth is paler than the rest of the wing. There is a large black discal spot and a black point in the middle of the cell. Between this and discal spot are two to three black points. A triangular black spot is found at base of the wing and several fuscous points are found along the costal margin and termen. The hindwings are whitish with a yellow tinge.

Etymology
The species is named for Hermann Höne, a German consul in Shanghai and entomologist, who collected the holotype.

References

Moths described in 2011
Agonopterix
Moths of Asia